The 1985 Benson and Hedges Open was a men's Grand Prix tennis tournament played on outdoor hard courts in Auckland, New Zealand. It was the 18th edition of the tournament and was held from 7 January to 14 January 1985. Seventh-seeded Chris Lewis won the singles title.

Finals

Singles

 Chris Lewis defeated  Wally Masur 7–5, 6–0, 2–6, 6–4
 It was Lewis's second title of the year and the 11th of his career.

Doubles
 John Fitzgerald /  Chris Lewis defeated  Broderick Dyke /  Wally Masur 7–6, 6–2
 It was Fitzgerald's first title of the year and the 13th of his career. It was Lewis's first title of the year and the 10th of his career.

References

External links
 
 ATP – tournament profile
 ITF – tournament edition details

Heineken Open
Heineken
ATP Auckland Open
January 1985 sports events in New Zealand